Germany competed at the 1992 Summer Olympics in Barcelona, Spain.  It was the first time the European nation participated after German reunification in 1990.  Previously, West Germany and East Germany had sent independent teams to the Games. 463 competitors, 300 men and 163 women, took part in 237 events in 26 sports.

Medalists

Competitors
The following is the list of number of competitors in the Games.

Archery

In Germany's fifth archery competition, only one of the six archers qualified for the individual elimination rounds.  He lost his first match, as did both the men's and women's teams.

Women's Individual Competition:
 Astrid Hanschen – Ranking round, 43rd place (0-0)
 Cornelia Pfohl – Ranking round, 44th place (0-0)
 Marion Wagner – Ranking round, 53rd place (0-0)

Men's Individual Competition:
 Frank Marzoch – Round of 32, 32nd place (0-1)
 Marc Rosicke – Ranking round, 38th place (0-0)
 Andreas Lippoldt – Ranking round, 43rd place (0-0)

Women's Team Competition:
 Hanschen, Pfohl, and Wagner – Round of 16, 10th place (0-1)

Men's Team Competition:
 Marzoch, Rosicke, and Lippoldt – Round of 16, 11th place (0-1)

Athletics

Men's competition
Men's 400 metres
Thomas Schönlebe
Rico Lieder

Men's 800 metres
Jörg Haas

Men's 1,500 metres
Jens-Peter Herold
Rüdiger Stenzel
Hauke Fuhlbrügge

Men's 5,000 metres
Dieter Baumann
 Heat – 13:20.82
 Final – 13:12.52 (→  Gold Medal)

Men's 10,000 metres
Stephane Franke
 Heat – 28:52.83 (→ did not advance)

Carsten Eich
 Heat – 29:22.19 (→ did not advance)

Men's 4 × 400 m Relay
Ralph Pfersich, Rico Lieder, Jörg Vaihinger, and Thomas Schönlebe
 Heat – DSQ (→ did not advance)

Men's Marathon
 Stephan Freigang – 2:14.00 (→  Bronze Medal)
 Konrad Dobler – 2:23.44 (→ 49th place)

Men's 110 metres Hurdles
Florian Schwarthoff
Dietmar Koszewski

Men's 400 metres Hurdles
Carsten Kohrbruck
 Heat – 49.37
 Semifinal – 49.41 (→ did not advance)

Olaf Hense
 Heat – 49.97
 Semifinal – DNS (→ did not advance)

Men's 3,000 metres Steeplechase
Steffen Brand
Hagen Melzer

Men's 20 km Walk
Robert Ihly – 1:26:56 (→ 11th place)
Axel Noack – 1:29:55 (→ 20th place)

Men's 50 km Walk
Ronald Weigel – 3:53:45 (→  Bronze Medal)
Hartwig Gauder – 3:56:47 (→ 6th place)

Men's High Jump
Ralf Sonn
Hendrik Beyer
Dietmar Mögenburg

Men's Long Jump
Dietmar Haaf 
 Qualification – 7.85 m (→ did not advance)

Konstantin Krause 
 Qualification – 7.50 m (→ did not advance)

Men's triple jump
Ralf Jaros 
 Qualification – 16.89 m (→ did not advance)

Men's Javelin Throw
Volker Hadwich 
 Qualification – 81.10 m
 Final – 75.28 m (→ 12th place)

Men's Hammer Throw
Heinz Weis 
 Qualification – 74.86 m
 Final – 76.90 m (→ 6th place)

Claus Dethloff 
 Qualification – 73.64 m (→ did not advance)

Men's Discus Throw
Jürgen Schult 
 Qualification – 63.46 m
 Final – 64.94 m (→  Silver Medal)

Lars Riedel 
 Qualification – 59.98 m (→ did not advance)

Men's Shot Put
Ulf Timmermann 
 Qualification – 19.93 m
 Final – 20.49 m (→ 5th place)

Udo Beyer 
 Qualification – 18.47 m (→ did not advance)

Kalman Konya 
 Qualification – did not start (→ did not advance)

Men's Decathlon
Paul Meier
Frank Müller
Thorsten Dauth

Women's competition
Women's 100 metres
Andrea Philipp

Women's 200 metres
Silke Knoll
Sabine Günther
Andrea Thomas

Women's 400 metres
Anja Rücker

Women's 800 metres
Sabine Zwiener
 Heat – 2:00.87 
 Semifinal – 2:02.64 (→ did not advance)

Sigrun Grau
 Heat – 2:00.31
 Semifinal – 2:00.91 (→ did not advance)

Christine Wachtel
 Heat – 2:01.39 (→ did not advance)

Women's 1,500 metres
Ellen Kießling

Women's 10,000 metres
Uta Pippig
 Heat – 32:07.28
 Final – 31:36.45 (→ 7th place)

Kerstin Preßler
 Heat – 33:17.88 (→ did not advance)

Kathrin Ullrich
 Heat – did not finish (→ no ranking)

Women's Marathon
 Katrin Dörre – 2:36.48 (→ 5th place)
 Birgit Jerschabek – 2:42.45 (→ 15th place)

Women's 100 metres Hurdles
 Gabi Roth
 Kristin Patzwahl
 Caren Jung

Women's 400 metres Hurdles
Heike Meissner
 Heat – 55.52
 Semifinal – 55.35 (→ did not advance)

Silvia Rieger
 Heat – 56.61 (→ did not advance)

Linda Kisabaka
 Heat – DNS (→ did not advance)

Women's 4×100 metres Relay
Andrea Philipp
Silke Knoll
Andrea Thomas 
Sabine Günther

Women's 4×400 metres Relay
Uta Rohländer
Heike Meißner
Linda Kisabaka
Anja Rücker

Women's 10 km Walk
Beate Anders
 Final – 46:31 (→ 16th place)

Kathrin Born-Boyde
 Final – 50:21 (→ 33rd place)

Women's High Jump
 Heike Henkel 
 Qualification – 1.92 m
 Final – 2.02 m (→  Gold Medal)

 Birgit Kahler 
 Qualification – 1.92 m
 Final – 1.88 m (→ 11th place)

 Marion Goldkamp 
 Qualification – 1.86 m (→ did not advance)

Women's Long Jump
 Heike Drechsler 
 Heat – 7.08 m
 Final – 7.14 m (→  Gold Medal)

 Susen Tiedtke 
 Heat – 6.74 m
 Final – 6.60 m (→ 8th place)

 Helga Radtke 
 Heat – 6.42 m (→ did not advance)

Women's Shot Put
 Kathrin Neimke
 Stephanie Storp

Women's Discus Throw
 Ilke Wyludda 
 Heat – 64.26m
 Final – 62.16m (→ 9th place)

 Franka Dietzsch 
 Heat – 63.60m
 Final – 60.24m (→ 12th place)

 Martina Hellmann 
 Heat – 60.52m (→ did not advance)

Women's Javelin Throw
 Silke Renk
 Karen Forkel
 Petra Felke

Women's Heptathlon
 Sabine Braun
 Peggy Beer
 Birgit Clarius

Badminton

Basketball

Boxing

Men's Light Flyweight (– 48 kg)
 Jan Quast →  Bronze Medal
 First round – Defeated Mohamed Zbir (MAR), 6:0 
 Second round – Defeated Pramuansak Phosuwan (THA), 11:2 
 Quarterfinals – Defeated Valentin Barbu (ROM), 15:7 
 Semifinals – Lost to Daniel Petrov (BUL), 9:15

Canoeing

Cycling

Seventeen cyclists, thirteen men and four women, represented Germany in 1992.

Men's road race
 Erik Zabel
 Steffen Wesemann
 Christian Meyer

Men's team time trial
 Bernd Dittert
 Christian Meyer
 Uwe Peschel
 Michael Rich

Men's sprint
 Jens Fiedler

Men's 1 km time trial
 Jens Glücklich

Men's individual pursuit
 Jens Lehmann

Men's team pursuit
 Michael Glöckner
 Jens Lehmann
 Stefan Steinweg
 Guido Fulst
 Andreas Walzer

Men's points race
 Guido Fulst

Women's road race
 Viola Paulitz – 2:05:03 (→ 19th place)
 Petra Rossner – 2:05:03 (→ 28th place)
 Jutta Niehaus – 2:08:13 (→ 44th place)

Women's sprint
 Annett Neumann

Women's individual pursuit
 Petra Rossner

Diving

Men's 3m Springboard
Albin Killat
 Preliminary round – 392.10 points
 Final – 556.35 points (→ 10th place)

Jan Hempel
 Preliminary round – 353.85 points (→ did not advance, 18th place)

Men's 10m Platform
Jan Hempel
 Preliminary round – 426.27 points
Final – 574.17 points (→ 4th place)

Michael Kühne
 Preliminary round – 393.21 points
Final – 558.54 points (→ 7th place)

Women's 3m Springboard
Brita Baldus
 Preliminary round – 312.90 points 
Final – 503.07 points (→  Bronze Medal)

Simona Koch
 Preliminary round – 281.46 points 
Final – 468.96 points (→ 7th place)

Women's 10m Platform
Ute Wetzig
Preliminary round – 284.13 points (→ did not advance, 14th place)

Monika Kühn
Preliminary round – 270.51 points (→ did not advance, 20th place)

Equestrian

Fencing

20 fencers, 15 men and 5 women represented Germany in 1992.

Men's foil
 Udo Wagner
 Ulrich Schreck
 Thorsten Weidner

Men's team foil
 Udo Wagner, Ulrich Schreck, Thorsten Weidner, Alexander Koch, Ingo Weißenborn

Men's épée
 Elmar Borrmann
 Robert Felisiak
 Arnd Schmitt

Men's team épée
 Elmar Borrmann, Robert Felisiak, Arnd Schmitt, Uwe Proske, Wladimir Reznitschenko

Men's sabre
 Jürgen Nolte
 Felix Becker
 Jörg Kempenich

Men's team sabre
 Felix Becker, Jörg Kempenich, Jürgen Nolte, Jacek Huchwajda, Steffen Wiesinger

Women's foil
 Sabine Bau
 Zita-Eva Funkenhauser
 Annette Dobmeier

Women's team foil
 Zita-Eva Funkenhauser, Sabine Bau, Anja Fichtel-Mauritz, Monika Weber-Koszto, Annette Dobmeier

Gymnastics

Handball

Men's team competition
Preliminary round (group B)
 Germany – Unified Team 25-15
 Germany – Romania 20-20
 Germany – France 20-23
 Germany – Egypt 24-16
 Germany – Spain 18-19
Classification Match
 9th/10th place: Germany – Czechoslovakia 19-20  (→ Tenth place)

Team roster
Jochen Fraatz
Matthias Hahn
Stephan Hauck
Jan Holpert
Michael Kiemm
Michael Krieter
Hendrik Ochel
Klaus-Dieter Petersen
Richard Ratka
Bernd Roos
Holger Schneider
Wolfgang Schwenke
Andreas Thiel
Frank-Michael Wahl
Holger Winselmann
Volker Zerbe
Head coach: Horst Bredemeier

Women's team competition
Preliminary round (group A)
 Germany – Nigeria 32-17
 Germany – United States 32-16
 Germany – Unified Team 22-28
Semi Finals
 Germany – South Korea 25-26
Bronze Medal Match
 Germany – Unified Team 20-24 (→ Fourth place)

Team roster
Sabine Heidrun Adamik
Andrea Bölk
Eike Bram
Carola Ciszewski
Michaela Erler
Silke Fittinger
Sybille Gruner
Rita Köster
Anja Krüger
Elena Leonte
Kerstin Mühlner
Gabriele Palme
Silvia Schmitt
Andrea Stolletz
Bianka Urbanke
Birgit Wagner
Head coach: Heinz Strauch

Hockey

Men's team competition
Preliminary round (group A)
 Germany – India 3 – 0
 Germany – Great Britain 2 – 0
 Germany – Australia 1 – 1
 Germany – Egypt 8 – 2
 Germany – Argentina 2 – 1
Semi Finals
 Germany – Pakistan 2 – 1
Final
 Germany – Australia 2 – 1 (→  Gold Medal)

Team roster
 Michael Knauth (gk)
 Christopher Reitz (gk)
 Carsten Fischer
 Jan-Peter Tewes
 Volker Fried
 Klaus Michler
 Andreas Keller
 Michael Metz
 Christian Blunck
 Sven Meinhardt
 Michael Hilgers
 Andreas Becker
 Stefan Saliger
 Stefan Tewes
 Christian Mayerhöfer
 Oliver Kurtz

Women's team competition
Preliminary round (group A)
 Germany – Spain 2 – 2
 Germany – Australia 0 – 1
 Germany – Canada 4 – 0
Semi Finals
 Germany – Great Britain 2 – 1
Final
 Germany – Spain 1 – 2 (→  Silver Medal)

Team roster
 Susie Wollschläger (gk)
 Simone Thomaschinski
 Caren Jungjohann
 Bianca Weiß (gk)
 Tina Peters
 Irina Kuhnt
 Britta Becker
 Anke Wild
 Tanja Dickenscheid
 Heike Lätzsch
 Franziska Hentschel
 Nadine Ernsting-Krienke
 Eva Hagenbäumer
 Christine Ferneck
 Katrin Kauschke
 Susanne Müller

Judo

Modern pentathlon

Three male pentathletes represented Germany in 1992.

Individual
 Dirk Knappheide
 Ulrich Czermak
 Pawel Olszewski

Team
 Dirk Knappheide
 Ulrich Czermak
 Pawel Olszewski

Rhythmic gymnastics

Rowing

Sailing

Men's Sailboard (Lechner A-390)
Timm Stade
 Final ranking – 214.0 points (→ 18th place)

Women's 470 Class
Peggy Hardwiger and Christina Pinnow
 Final ranking – 71.7 points (→ 8th place)

Shooting

Swimming

Men's competition
Men's 50 m Freestyle
 Nils Rudolph
 Heat – 22.70
 Final – 22.73 (→ 8th place)

 Mark Pinger
 Heat – 22.88
 B-Final – 22.88 (→ 11th place)

Men's 100 m Freestyle
 Christian Tröger
 Heat – 50.05
 Final – 49.84 (→ 7th place)

 Nils Rudolph
 Heat – 50.29
 B-Final – 50.62 (→ 12th place)

Men's 200 m Freestyle
 Steffen Zesner
 Heat – 1:48.12
 Final – 1:48.84 (→ 7th place)

 Christian Keller
 Heat – 1:50.07
 B-Final – 1:50.46 (→ 14th place)

Men's 400 m Freestyle
 Sebastian Wiese
 Heat – 3:50.73
 Final – 3:49.06 (→ 6th place)

 Stefan Pfeiffer
 Heat – 3:49.99
 Final – 3:49.75 (→ 7th place)

Men's 1500 m Freestyle
 Jörg Hoffmann
 Heat – 15:03.95
 Final – 15:02.29 (→  Bronze Medal)

 Stefan Pfeiffer
 Heat – 15:13.71 
 Final – 15:04.28 (→ 4th place)

Men's 100 m Backstroke
 Dirk Richter
 Heat – 56.03
 Final – 56.26 (→ 8th place)

 Tino Weber
 Heat – 56.27
 B-Final – 56.49 (→ 11th place)

Men's 200 m Backstroke
 Tino Weber
 Heat – 1:59.40
 Final – 1:59.78 (→ 7th place)

 Dirk Richter
 Heat – 2:00.94
 B-Final – DNS (→ no ranking)

Men's 100 m Breaststroke
 Mark Warnecke
 Heat – 1:02.48
 B-Final – 1:02.73 (→ 13th place)

 Christian Poswiat
 Heat – 1:03.85 (→ did not advance, 26th place)

Men's 200 m Breaststroke
 Christian Poswiat
 Heat – 2:20.80 (→ did not advance, 29th place)

Men's 100 m Butterfly
 Christian Keller
 Heat – 54.47
 B-Final – 54.30 (→ 9th place)

 Martin Herrmann
 Heat – 54.59
 B-Final – 54.94 (→ 14th place)

Men's 200 m Butterfly
 Chris-Carol Bremer
 Heat – 2:00.49
 B-Final – 1:59.93 (→ 9th place)

 Martin Herrmann
 Heat – 2:00.47
 B-Final – 2:01.14 (→ 11th place)

Men's 200 m Individual Medley
 Christian Gessner
 Heat – 2:02.43
 Final – 2:01.97 (→ 5th place)

 Josef Hladký
 Heat – 2:07.18 (→ did not advance, 32nd place)

Men's 400 m Individual Medley
 Christian Gessner
 Heat – 4:19.92
 Final – 4:17.88 (→ 5th place)

 Patrick Kühl
 Heat – 4:18.68
 Final – 4:19.66 (→ 6th place)

Men's 4 × 100 m Freestyle Relay 
 Andreas Szigat, Christian Tröger, Bengt Zikarsky, and Dirk Richter
 Heat – 3:19.61 
 Mark Pinger, Dirk Richter, Christian Tröger, and Steffen Zesner
 Final – 3:17.90 (→  Bronze Medal)

Men's 4 × 200 m Freestyle Relay 
 Peter Sitt, Christian Tröger, Andreas Szigat, and Stefan Pfeiffer
 Heat – 7:18.21
 Andreas Szigat, Peter Sitt, Steffen Zesner, and Stefan Pfeiffer
 Final – 7:16.58 (→ 4th place)

Men's 4 × 100 m Medley Relay 
 Tino Weber, Mark Warnecke, Christian Keller, and Bengt Zikarsky
 Heat – 3:43.00
 Tino Weber, Mark Warnecke, Christian Keller, and Mark Pinger
 Final – 3:40.19 (→ 4th place)

Women's competition
Women's 50 m Freestyle
 Simone Osygus
 Heat – 25.79
 Final – 25.74 (→ 7th place)

 Franziska van Almsick
 Heat – 25.96
 B-Final – DSQ (→ no ranking)

Women's 100 m Freestyle
 Franziska van Almsick
 Heat – 55.40
 Final – 54.94 (→  Bronze Medal)

 Simone Osygus
 Heat – 55.98
 Final – 55.93 (→ 7th place)

Women's 200 m Freestyle
 Franziska van Almsick
 Heat – 1:57.90
 Final – 1:58.00 (→  Silver Medal)

 Kerstin Kielgass
 Heat – 2:00.55
 Final – 1:59.67 (→  Bronze Medal)

Women's 400 m Freestyle
 Dagmar Hase
 Heat – 4:10.92
 Final – 4:07.18 (→  Gold Medal)

 Kerstin Kielgass
 Heat – 4:12.50
 Final – 4:11.52 (→ 5th place)

Women's 800 m Freestyle
 Jana Henke
 Heat – 8:35.11
 Final – 8:30.99 (→  Bronze Medal)

 Kerstin Kielgass
 Heat – 8:43.52 (→ did not advance, 9th place)

Women's 100 m Backstroke
 Sandra Völker
 Heat – 1:02.90
 B-Final – 1:04.52 (→ 16th place)

 Dagmar Hase
 Heat – 1:03.35
 B-Final – 1:02.93 (→ 9th place)

Women's 200 m Backstroke
 Dagmar Hase
 Heat – 2:11.52
 Final – 2:09.46 (→  Silver Medal)

 Marion Zoller
 Heat – 2:14.53
 B-Final – 2:13.77 (→ 9th place)

Women's 100 m Breaststroke
 Jana Dörries
 Heat – 1:10.00
 Final – 1:09.77 (→ 5th place)

 Daniela Brendel
 Heat – 1:10.49
 Final – 1:11.05 (→ 8th place)

Women's 200 m Breaststroke
 Daniela Brendel
 Heat – 2:32.09
 B-Final – 2:32.05 (→ 10th place)

 Jana Dörries
 Heat – 2:34.58 (→ did not advance, 18th place)

Women's 100 m Butterfly
 Franziska van Almsick
 Heat – 1:00.02
 Final – 1:00.70 (→ 7th place)

 Bettina Ustrowski
 Heat – 1:02.07 (→ did not advance, 18th place)

Women's 200 m Butterfly
 Bettina Ustrowski
 Heat – 2:21.49 (→ did not advance, 26th place)

Women's 200 m Individual Medley
 Daniela Hunger
 Heat – 2:15.16 
 Final – 2:13.92 (→  Bronze Medal)

 Jana Haas
 Heat – 2:17.74
 B-Final – 2:20.94 (→ 16th place)

Women's 400 m Individual Medley
 Daniela Hunger
 Heat – 4:47.39
 Final – 4:47.57 (→ 6th place)

 Jana Haas
 Heat – 4:49.93
 B-Final – 4:47.74 (→ 9th place)

Women's 4 × 100 m Freestyle Relay
Annette Hadding, Simone Osygus, Kerstin Kielgass, and Manuela Stellmach
 Heat – 3:43.58
Franziska van Almsick, Simone Osygus, Daniela Hunger, and Manuela Stellmach
 Final – 3:41.60 (→  Bronze Medal)

Women's 4 × 100 m Medley Relay
Dagmar Hase, Daniele Brendel, Bettina Ustrowski, and Simone Osygus
 Heat – 4:10.62 
Dagmar Hase, Jana Dörries, Franziska van Almsick, and Daniela Hunger
 Final – 4:05.19 (→  Silver Medal)

Synchronized swimming

Two synchronized swimmers represented Germany in 1992.

Women's solo
 Monika Müller
 Margit Schreib

Women's duet
 Monika Müller
 Margit Schreib

Table tennis

Tennis

Men's Singles Competition
 Boris Becker
 First round – Defeated Christian Ruud (Norway) 3-6, 7-6, 5-7, 7-6, 6-3
 Second round – Defeated Younes El Aynaoui (Morocco) 6-4, 5-7, 6-4, 6-0 
 Third round – Lost to Fabrice Santoro (France) 1-6, 6-3, 1-6, 3-6

 Michael Stich
 First round – Defeated Richard Fromberg (Australia) 6-3, 3-6, 6-1, 3-6, 6-3
 Second round – Lost to Carl-Uwe Steeb (Germany) 4-6, 2-6, 6-4, 3-6

 Carl-Uwe Steeb 
 First round – Defeated Richard Fromberg (Australia) 6-3, 3-6, 6-1, 3-6, 6-3
 Second round – Defeated Michael Stich (Germany) 6-4, 6-2, 4-6, 6-3
 Third round – Lost to Leonardo Lavalle (Mexico) 4-6, 6-3, 3-6, 2-6

Men's Doubles Competition
 Boris Becker and Michael Stich →  Gold Medal
 First round – Defeated Karim Alami and Younes El Aynaoui (Morocco) walk over
 Second round – Defeated Anastasios Bavelas and Konstantinos Efraimoglou (Greece) 6-3, 6-1, 6-4
 Quarterfinals – Defeated Sergio Casal and Emilio Sánchez (Spain) 6-3, 4-6, 7-6, 5-7, 6-3
 Semifinals – Defeated Javier Frana and Christian Miniussi (Argentina) 7-6, 6-2, 6-7, 2-6, 6-4
 Final – Defeated Wayne Ferreira and Piet Norval (South Africa) 7-6, 4-6, 7-6, 6-3

Women's Singles Competition
 Steffi Graf →  Silver Medal
 First round – Defeated Lupita Novelo (Mexico) 6-1, 6-1
 Second round – Defeated Brenda Schultz-McCarthy (Netherlands) 6-1, 6-0
 Third round – Defeated Magdalena Maleeva (Bulgaria) 6-3, 6-4
 Quarterfinals – Defeated Sabine Appelmans (Belgium) 6-1, 6-0 
 Semifinals – Defeated Mary Joe Fernandez (USA) 6-3, 6-4
 Final – Lost to Jennifer Capriati (USA) 6-3, 3-6, 4-6

 Anke Huber
 First round – Defeated Naoko Sawamatsu (Japan) 6-0, 4-6, 6-2 
 Second round – Defeated Barbara Paulus (Austria) 6-4, 6-1 
 Third round – Defeated Nicole Muns-Jagerman (Netherlands) 7-5, 7-6 
 Quarterfinals – Lost to Jennifer Capriati (USA) 3-6, 6-7

 Barbara Rittner
 First round – Defeated Florencia Labat (Argentina) 6-3, 6-3
 Second round – Defeated Nathalie Tauziat (France) 6-3, 6-2
 Third round – Lost to Arantxa Sánchez Vicario (Spain) 6-4, 3-6, 1-6

Water polo

Men's team Competition
Preliminary round (group A)
 Tied with France (7-7)
 Lost to Unified Team (7-11)
 Defeated Czechoslovakia (15-9)
 Tied with Australia (7-7)
 Lost to United States (2-7)
Classification Matches
 Lost to Hungary (7-8)
 Defeated Cuba (10-6) → 7th place

Team roster
Frank Otto 
Hagen Stamm
Dirk Theissmann
Ingo Borgmann
Rene Reimann
Uwe Sterzik
Piotr Bukowski
Raúl de la Peña
Jörg Dresel
Torsten Dresel
Reibel Guido
Carsten Kusch

Weightlifting

Wrestling

References

Nations at the 1992 Summer Olympics
1992
Summer Olympics